John "Jack" Townend (date of birth unknown – date of death unknown) was a professional rugby league footballer who played in the 1890s and 1900s. He played at club level for Hull FC, and was captain of Hull F.C. during the 1900–01 season.

References

External links
Search for "Townend" at rugbyleagueproject.org

Stats → Past Players → "T"
Statistics at hullfc.com

Hull F.C. players
Place of birth missing
Place of death missing
English rugby league players
Year of birth missing
Year of death missing